La Drôme Classic is an elite men's road bicycle racing event held annually in the Drôme region of France, held by the Ruoms Cyclisme Organisation. It is run as part of a weekend of racing in the south Ardèche, known as the Boucles du Sud Ardèche, along with the Classic Sud-Ardèche.

Since 2013, the men's event is UCI 1.1 rated and is part of the UCI Europe Tour. The first edition of the race, due to be held on 23 February 2013, was cancelled due to snow.

Beginning in 2020, the race was renamed as the Royal Bernard Drôme Classic.

Winners

References

External links
  

 
Cycle races in France
UCI Europe Tour races
Recurring sporting events established in 2013
2013 establishments in France